Bada Din is a 1998 Indian Hindi-language romantic drama film directed by Anjan Dutt. It stars Marc Robinson, Tara Deshpande, Shabana Azmi and Irrfan Khan. It is about a couple who face tribulations while helping a mute boy on Christmas Day (known as bada din in Hindi). This was Irrfan Khan's first role in a commercial Bollywood film, who had worked in parallel Indian cinema prior to this.

Cast
 Shabana Azmi as Lilian
 Marc Robinson as David Dawson
 Tara Deshpande as Nandini Shom
 Alok Nath as Shankar Babu
 Debasish Banerjee as Police Sub-Inspector
 Kalyan Chatterjee as Karim
 Irrfan Khan as Police Inspector
 Sanjay Pathak as Raka
 Suman Mukherjee as David's friend
 Abhay Chopra

Soundtrack
The soundtrack is composed by Jatin–Lalit with lyrics by Javed Akhtar.

See also
 List of Christmas films

References

External links

1990s Hindi-language films
1998 films
Films scored by Jatin–Lalit
Films set in Kolkata
Films directed by Anjan Dutt
Indian Christmas films
Films about Christianity
Christianity in India
Indian Sign Language films